Neosciadella is a genus of beetles in the family Cerambycidae, containing the following species:

 Neosciadella brunnipes Dillon & Dillon, 1952
 Neosciadella cordata Dillon & Dillon, 1952
 Neosciadella fulgida Dillon & Dillon, 1952
 Neosciadella immaculosa Dillon & Dillon, 1952
 Neosciadella inflexa Dillon & Dillon, 1952
 Neosciadella multivittata Dillon & Dillon, 1952
 Neosciadella obliquata Dillon & Dillon, 1952
 Neosciadella quadripustulata Dillon & Dillon, 1952
 Neosciadella spixi Dillon & Dillon, 1952

References

Acanthocinini